Mark Edmondson and Kim Warwick defeated the defending champions Paul McNamee and Peter McNamara in the final, 7–5, 6–4 to win the men's doubles tennis title at the 1980 Australian Open.

Seeds
 Paul McNamee /  Peter McNamara (final)
 Brian Gottfried /  Sandy Mayer (quarterfinals)
 Victor Amaya /  Hank Pfister (second round)
 Kevin Curren /  Steve Denton (first round)
 Ivan Lendl /  Bill Scanlon (first round)
 Fritz Buehning /  Ferdi Taygan (first round)
 Mark Edmondson /  Kim Warwick (champions)
 Peter Fleming /  Peter Rennert (first round)

Draw

Finals

Top half

Bottom half

External links
 1980 Australian Open – Men's draws and results at the International Tennis Federation

Men's Doubles
Australian Open (tennis) by year – Men's doubles